A world championship is generally an international competition open to elite competitors from around the world, representing their nations, and winning such an event will be considered the highest or near highest achievement in the sport, game, or ability.

How the championship title is assigned

The title is usually awarded through a combination of specific contests or, less commonly, ranking systems (e.g. the ICC Test Championship), or a combination of the two (e.g. World Triathlon Championships in Triathlon). This determines a 'world champion', who or which is commonly considered the best nation, team, individual (or other entity) in the world in a particular field, although the vagaries of sport ensure that the competitor recognised at the best in an event is not always the 'world champion' (see Underdog). This may also be known as a world cup competition; for example cycling (UCI World Championships and UCI World Cups). Often, the use of the term cup or championship in this sense is just a choice of words. Some sports have multiple champions because of multiple organizations, such as boxing, mixed martial arts and wrestling.

Certain competitive exercises do not have a world championship or a world cup as such, but may have one or several world champions. Professional boxing, for example, has several world champions at different weights, but each one of them is decided by a "title match", not a tournament. In a title match system, the championship can only be won by directly defeating the incumbent, who in turn must continue to compete to retain their title or risk forfeiture. 

Still other competitions, most commonly in professional sports, may or may not have a true world championship but may designate the winners of a domestic competition to be "world champions." This is especially true of the "Big Four" major professional sports leagues in the United States and Canada; world cups and championships exist in all four of the major sports, but the domestic U.S. and Canadian leagues are generally known as the world professional championships (as with the Stanley Cup, ostensibly an independent championship for ice hockey but under the de facto control of the National Hockey League through two trustees who since no later than 1947 have been NHL loyalists) or the equivalent of a world club championship. In American football, although an IFAF World Championship exists, the United States is so far above and beyond the other nations it faces that the winner of the U.S.-based Super Bowl, a competition limited to the 32 teams in the National Football League, is commonly nicknamed as the world champion by the players, the press and fans alike; the NFL itself explicitly marketed the contest as a world championship in its first iterations. Winners of the Major League Baseball's World Series are also commonly called world champions.

On the other hand, association football (soccer) has more parity between national leagues and even continental tournaments has seen the birth of one true "world championship". The first such tournament was the Football World Championship disputed from 1876 to 1904 between the winners of the FA Cup and Scottish Cup. After that, there have been many tournaments between teams from around the world, but it wasn't until 1960 when the Intercontinental Cup was established, competed between the winners two greatest and most important continental championships: the UEFA Champions League from Europe and COMNEBOL Copa Libertadores from South America, the cup was endorsed by both UEFA and CONMEBOL but had no involvement from FIFA, the governing body for world football. As such, FIFA wanted to expand the tournament to include the champion from other continents - from the AFC Champions League (Asia and Australia), CAF Champions League (Africa), CONCACAF Champions League (North America and Caribbean) and OFC Champions League (Oceania) and created the FIFA Club World Cup. The first edition in 2000 ran concurrently with the 2000 Intercontinental Cup, in 2004 the Intercontinental Cup was merged with the CCW, which has been ongoing since 2005 with yearly editions.

Finally, certain competitions do not have a world championship or world cup, but rather hold a series of events recognised as the elite level in their field (e.g. tennis and golf have a series of four Grand Slam events recognised as the pinnacle of the game, in addition to key team events, world tour finals and the Olympic Games, though each year ITF (International Tennis Federation) designates a World Champion based on performances throughout the year).

History 

There are a few sports which already had a ‘world championship’ in the 18th or 19th century, although it could vary how ‘world-wide’ these competitions really were. The French player Clergé, is considered the first international champion in real tennis, since 1740. In chess, international matches have been held for centuries, often resulting in certain players considered the best of all, with the first multiplayer tournament held in 1851 (London 1851). However, Wilhelm Steinitz in 1886 was the first chess player generally recognized as the world champion.

Other sports with early ‘world championships’ were English draughts (1840) and speed skating.

Overview 
See the following lists for the various sports with a world championship.
 List of world sports championships, for physical sports
 List of world championships in mind sports, including several other activities like competitions in professional activities

Other competition names
 Beatbox Battle World Championship
 Nathan's Hot Dog Eating Contest
 World Conker Championships
 World Pea Shooting Championships
 World Pie Eating Championship
 World Championship of Ping Pong

See also
 List of world sports championships
 World cup
 List of world cups
 List of world cups and world championships for juniors and youth

References

Sports terminology